Maria Karlsson (born 14 May 1983) is a Swedish footballer who played for Linköpings FC in the Swedish Damallsvenskan. She can play both defender and midfielder and she was a member of Sweden women's national football team.

At Linköpings Karlsson was known as Maria "Mia" Karlsson, due to the presence of younger team–mate and namesake Maria "Kalle" Karlsson. Both left the club after the 2010 Damallsvenskan season. The elder Karlsson was particularly well thought of by Linköpings as she had joined in 2000, when the club played outside the top division and were known as Kenty DFF.

She subsequently played for local club BK Tinnis when her police training allowed. In 2013, she was dual–signed to Växjö FF.

Karlsson made her senior Sweden debut on 26 June 2004; a 2–1 Euro 2005 qualifying defeat to Italy in Benevento. She was included in the squad for the final tournament.

References

1983 births
Swedish women's footballers
Sweden women's international footballers
Living people
Damallsvenskan players
Linköpings FC players
Women's association football midfielders
Women's association football defenders
Växjö DFF players